Ajax Honkbalvereniging Amsterdam, also referred to as Ajax HVA, Ajax Amsterdam or simply Ajax (after the legendary Greek hero), was a Dutch professional baseball club based in Amsterdam. The club were founding members of the Dutch Hoofdklasse, where they competed since the league's inception in 1922 until the club folded in 1972, having won the league title a total four times.

The team was associated with acclaimed Dutch football club AFC Ajax, in their attempt to expand into baseball, having spent 50 years at the top flight of professional baseball in the Netherlands.

History

As founding members of the Dutch Hoofdklasse in 1922, Amsterdam's well-known football club AFC Ajax fielded a baseball team in the highest level of professional baseball in the Netherlands, playing their home matches at the stadium of OVVO on the Kruislaan in Amsterdam-Oost. Famous former players include Marco Nagelkerken, Ruben Leysner, Peter Hendriks, Boy Balinge, Ko van Wijk, Leo van Wijk, Herre Kok, Dassy Jasmijn, Jessie Delanoy. In 1972 the club decided to no longer field a baseball team, and to focus solely on football, leaving the baseball players of Ajax without a club. The players soon found a new sponsor with mustard manufacturing company Luycks. Finally merging with another baseball club from Amsterdam the Giants Diemen, together they formed the Luycks Giants, which replaced both its former clubs.

In 1977 the Sponsor changed to Uitzendburo Unique and the club's name was forthwith "Unique Giants", which existed until at least 1980.

Legendary Dutch football player Johan Cruijff played for the club's baseball team during the summer (football off-season) early on in his career. He played in various positions on the team including catcher, as seen in a photograph dated from 1961 on the club's website.

Notable former players 
 Johan Cruijff
 Marco Nagelkerken
 Ruben Leysner
 Peter Hendriks
 Boy Balinge
 Ko van Wijk
 Leo van Wijk
 Herre Kok
 Dassy Jasmijn
 Jessie Delanoy

Honours

National
Hoofdklasse: 4
 1924, 1928, 1942, 1948

References

External links
AFC Ajax (Official Website)
 Historie - TIW-Survivors, TIW-Survivors (per 2020-03-12)
KNBSB Dutch baseball and softball association

AFC Ajax
Sports clubs in Amsterdam
Defunct baseball teams in the Netherlands